INS Kirpan is a , currently in service with the Indian Navy.

References

Khukri-class corvettes
Corvettes of the Indian Navy
Naval ships of India
1988 ships
Ships built in India